Romance is an unincorporated community in west-central White County, Arkansas, United States. The community is located approximately halfway between the town of Rose Bud to the north, and the unincorporated community of El Paso to the south.

Considered as a postal designation (ZIP code: 72136), the population of Romance as of the 2010 census was 1,772 residents.

Geography and history
Lacking exact boundaries, much of the Romance area falls within the borders of Marshall Township and Kentucky Township within White County. As legend maintains, the community was named by a school teacher many years ago who thought the view from bluffs on the community's eastern side was particularly romantic.

Naming of the community has proven significant in maintaining Romance's most visible business, a small branch post office of the United States Postal Service. The local post office is one of several within the USPS system that gain attention because of "love-themed" names, but received special focus in 1990 as the first location to issue that year's stamp in the USPS Love Stamp series. Romance's post office is among those popular around the United States for postmarks of cards for Valentine's Day, as well as for wedding invitations. A side venture of sorts has developed in recent years, with a small number of weddings performed on the grounds of the post office, though the practice is not affiliated with the USPS.

Government
As an unincorporated community, local government of Romance is part of the jurisdiction of the county judge of White County, the county's chief executive, and subject to county-wide ordinances. The current County Judge is Michael Lincoln of Searcy. The community is represented legislatively in the county's quorum court in Searcy, the county seat, during monthly and special meetings by the quorum court district's justice of the peace. Local law enforcement, similarly, is provided directly from the county level by deputies of the White County Sheriff's Department, as well as township constables for Marshall and Kentucky townships. The current Sheriff is Ricky Shourd and the current Constable is Curtis Elliot. Judicial enforcement is the responsibility of the circuit court judge and prosecuting attorney.

The drop zone was first established in the early 1980s.

Additionally, Romance is represented legislatively on the state level in the Arkansas General Assembly as part of Senate District 18 (Senator Missy Irvin) and House District 44 (Representative Cameron Cooper); the community is part of Arkansas's 2nd Congressional District on the federal level.

Terrain and climate
Small creeks and ponds can be found around the community, including Cedar Creek on Romance's south side. Clifty Creek flows through the center of Romance. Bad Luck Creek and Bayou Des Arc also flow nearby to the east, with Des Arc being dammed and forming Barnett Lake between Romance and the nearby community of Floyd. Scenic waterfalls can be found along these streams. There are a series of steep and elevated bluffs along Highway 31, with several pull off points to enjoy the scenic view. Geographically, Romance is considered to be in the foothills of the Ozark Mountains. The southern portion of the community, which is situated atop Black Jack Mountain, is significantly higher in elevation than other parts of Romance. The overall climate is somewhat similar to that found in other north central Arkansas communities, with warm, dry summers and cold, wet winters. Severe weather can include thunderstorms, hail, and tornados during the warm months, with snow, sleet, freezing rain and frigid windchills in the winter months.

Transportation
Romance is situated along two major Arkansas state highways:
 Highway 5, a north–south highway serving central Arkansas. This major portion of the highway continues north to the Missouri state line, and south to Cabot at U.S. Highway 67. Among other intersections, this path provides access to U.S. Highway 64 at El Paso, and U.S. Highways 62 and 412 in Mountain Home.
 Highway 31, a north–south highway with a northern terminus in Romance at Arkansas 5, and continuing through Beebe and Lonoke towards its southern terminus at the U.S. Highway 79 business loop northeast of Pine Bluff. The path provides access to U.S. Highway 67 in Beebe, and Interstate 40 in Lonoke.

The majority of roads in the area are administered by the White County Road Department, including Hilltop Acres, which serves the center of Romance and connects to both Arkansas 5 (opposite Manning Road) and Arkansas 31 (opposite Rogers Road). Passing by the former Romance Store building, which once housed the community's post office, the southern portion of Hilltop Acres travels through something of an unofficial downtown area. The post office was relocated to a lot along Arkansas 31 in the early 1990s; the remaining general store closed soon afterward.

Among county roads in the area, four major roads serve greater Romance:
 Blackjack Mountain Road (White County Road 149) is a paved road of the White County road system that travels south of but somewhat parallel to the westernmost portion of Arkansas 31. The name of the approximately 6.5-mile-long east–west road is taken from blackjack oak trees found throughout the hills on Romance's south side. Its western terminus is at Arkansas 5, opposite a portion of Highway 310. Its eastern terminus is at Arkansas 31, to the northwest of the unincorporated community of Floyd.
 Romance Road (White County Road 26) is an east–west unpaved road of the White County road system that travels from its western terminus at Kentucky Valley Road near Romance's center to approximately 1/2 mile east of Gravel Hill Road, currently dead ending at Quattlebaum Cemetery, in the unincorporated community of Gravel Hill. A portion of the road runs parallel to Bad Luck Creek. For all basic purposes, the Gravel Hill community is considered an integral part of the greater Romance area. The local fire departments have noted that the Floyd/Romance Volunteer Fire Department will service those living on the south end of Gravel Hill Road, with the department based in the nearby unincorporated community of Joy providing service to those on the north end of Gravel Hill.
 Kentucky Valley Road (White County Road 157) is a paved road of the White County road system with a varied path mostly traveling north and northeast of the center of Romance. Its southern terminus is at Hilltop Acres, to the right of former Romance Store building and leading past the community's volunteer-staffed fire station. Occasionally taking 90-degree turns, its final turn is toward a northern terminus at Daffodil Road. Kentucky Valley Road travels toward Kentucky Township, with both the road and township taking their names from early settlers of the area having arrived from Kentucky.
 Daffodil Road is a north–south unpaved road of the White County road system that travels mostly north and northwest from a southern terminus intersecting with Hilltop Acres, as that road veers to the left, near the center of Romance. Daffodil Road continues toward a northern terminus at Denison Road, south of Rose Bud.

The closest navigable waterway for commercial use is the Arkansas River at Little Rock. Commercial rail service is available in Little Rock and North Little Rock, with passenger rail service also in Little Rock. The nearest airfield is Cantrell Field, southwest of the city limits of Conway, offering charter service at Conway Municipal Airport (CXW). Major airlines and air freight service are available in Little Rock at Little Rock National Airport (LIT), Adams Field.

Education

Early childhood
Education for children in Romance prior to the age of five years is primarily home-based, though a limited amount of day-care facilities can be found within short drives of the community.

Elementary and secondary
Children in the greater Romance area are largely served by the Rose Bud Public School District from pre-K through twelfth grade in nearby Rose Bud. Romance's school district was consolidated with the Rose Bud district during the 1950s, and the community had a local school as early as 1895, when the Harper School on Blackjack Mountain operated.  Some eastern portions of the community, near neighboring Floyd, are part of the Beebe Public School District. Both are member schools of the Beebe-based Wilbur D. Mills Educational Service Cooperative. Areas near Highway 310 and Hammons Chapel Road, toward White County's western edge, are part of the Mount Vernon–Enola School District, part of the Arch Ford Educational Service Cooperative based in Plumerville.

Colleges and universities
Seven post-secondary institutions of higher learning are located within a  radius of Romance:
 Arkansas State University Beebe –  a campus of the state's second-largest public university – is a satellite of the main campus in Jonesboro. ASU-Beebe further serves as a parent campus to two-year branch campuses in Searcy and Heber Springs within the radius; a learning center operated at Little Rock Air Force Base is also part of the ASU-Beebe system. Via distance learning connections, the Beebe campus offers varied bachelor's degrees as well as several associate-level degrees. The university is the oldest and second-largest two-year institution in the state, in terms of student enrollment.
 Harding University, a private four-year university affiliated with the Churches of Christ, with its main campus in Searcy, a school of theology in Memphis, Tennessee, and varied international study programs in Europe, Africa, South America and Australia.
 Hendrix College, a private four-year college affiliated with the United Methodist Church, located in Conway, and like Harding, regarded by many as one of the most prestigious institutions of its kind in Arkansas.
 The University of Central Arkansas, a leading four-year public university in the region, located in Conway, particularly notable for programs in educating teachers. The broadcast center for Arkansas PBS is located on the UCA campus.
 Central Baptist College, a private four-year college affiliated with the Missionary Baptist Church, located in Conway and near the UCA campus. The school is notable for religious studies programs, with more recently developed programs geared toward instruction in media, public service and medical careers.

Economy
Few businesses are found in Romance, with commuting to jobs in surrounding communities being very common. The average travel time from home to work as of 2000 is typically around 44 minutes, according to research from the U.S. Census Bureau. Those businesses most easily identified, other than the USPS, include hay and grass farming, raising of livestock, meat processing, and antique and craft sales. The Romance area is also part of the Fayetteville Shale Play, a region for natural gas resource exploration throughout northern Arkansas since 2005.

In popular culture
During early 2012, the Animal Planet series American Stuffers chronicled the owner and staff of Xtreme Taxidermy, a Romance area taxidermy shop specializing in pet preservation located approximately two miles south of Blackjack Mountain Road along Arkansas Highway 5. In the 1988 movie 'Homeboy' Mickey Rourke's lead character Johnny Walker wears a Romance, Arkansas belt buckle.

References

External links
 United States Postal Service press information, from 2003, related to love-themed postmarks at Romance and other locations
 Website showing the 1990 USPS Love Stamp as part of a commemorative issue
 Website showing the  Romance Store and immediate surrounding area, from 1930. The store building currently still stands.
 Full population statistics for the Romance ZIP code (72136) from the United States Census Bureau (2000)

Unincorporated communities in Arkansas
Unincorporated communities in White County, Arkansas